County Road 889 is  long and runs between Smørfjord and Havøysund in Troms og Finnmark, Norway. The road runs through Porsanger, Hammerfest and Måsøy, and passes the small villages of Kokelv, Selkop, Lillefjord, Latter, Slåtten, Snefjord, Krokelv and Bakfjord. At Smørfjord, the road branches from E69. It crosses to Havøysund across the Havøysund Bridge. The section from Kokelv to Havøysund is designated one of eighteen National Tourist Routes in Norway.

References

889
National Tourist Routes in Norway
889
Porsanger
Kvalsund
Måsøy
Roads within the Arctic Circle